Precious Arts (نفائس الفنون) is an encyclopedia of science by Shamsedin Mohammed ebn-e Mahmoud Amoli, also known as al-Amoli, written in 1339 in the Persian Language. The 150 arts and crafts of the time are explained in the book, structured to be used by the students of science.

Notes
 Introduction to Precious Arts by "Islamic publications" in Tehran
 Methodology of Persian language by Mohammad-Taqi Bahar

External links 
 Digital Library of Iran The book of Precious Arts (in Persian language)

Persian encyclopedias
1330s books